Juventus F.C. finished 6th in the 1984-85 Serie A season and won the European Cup for the first time at the Heysel Stadium. However, the season was marked by the Heysel Stadium disaster in which 39 people died, mostly Juventus supporters.

Squad

Goalkeepers
  Luciano Bodini
  Stefano Tacconi

Defenders
  Gaetano Scirea
  Luciano Favero
  Antonio Cabrini
  Sergio Brio
  Stefano Pioli
  Nicola Caricola
  Vincenzo Mastrototaro

Midfielders
  Massimo Bonini
  Marco Tardelli
  Michel Platini
  Beniamino Vignola
  Cesare Prandelli
  Giovanni Koetting
  Bruno Limido
  Aldo Docetti

Attackers
  Massimo Briaschi
  Paolo Rossi
  Zbigniew Boniek
  Mauro Deriggi
  Michele Scola

Competitions

Serie A

League table

Matches

Coppa Italia

Group phase

Eightfinals

Quarterfinals

European Cup

First round

Second round

Quarter-finals

Semi-finals

Final

UEFA Super Cup

References

Juventus F.C. seasons
Juventus
UEFA Champions League-winning seasons